Jamides cyta, the pale cerulean, is a butterfly of the lycaenids or blues family. It is found throughout South-east Asia, from Malaysia to the Solomon Islands and the Philippines, as well as Queensland in Australia.

The wingspan is about 30 mm. Adult males are pale blue on top. Females are similar but the forewings have black wing tips and margins, and each hindwing has a subterminal arc of black spots. The underside of both sexes is grey with several arcs of white dashes, and the females often have a white patch under each forewing.

The larvae feed on the flower buds, flowers and fruit of Syzygium puberulum. Other recorded food plants are Eugenia, Elettaria (including E. cardomomum) and Kaempferia species (including K. pandurata). They are brown with a dark brown head and thorax. They are covered in dense fine hairs.

Subspecies
 J. c. cyta (New Ireland, New Hanover)
 J. c. amphissa C. Felder and R. Felder, 1860 (Bachan, Halmahera)
 J. c. amphissina Grose-Smith, 1894 (West Irian: Humboldt Bay)
 J. c. aruanus (Röber), [1886] (Aru)
 J. c. courvoisieri (Fruhstorfer, 1915) (Nias)
 J. c. claudia (Waterhouse and Lyell, 1914) (northern Queensland: Claudie River) - pale cerulean
 J. c. hellada (Fruhstorfer, 1915) (Sula Islands)
 J. c. koenigswarteri Schröder, Treadaway and Nuyda, 1993 (Philippines: Mindoro)
 J. c. lamax Riley, 1945 (Mentawi)
 J. c. leiothrix (Fruhstorfer, 1915) (Enggano)
 J. c. lividus (Druce, 1895) (Borneo)
 J. c. madara (Fruhstorfer, 1915) (Kai Island)
 J. c. margarita (Martin, 1895) (Sumatra)
 J. c. megdora (Fruhstorfer, 1915) (Obi)
 J. c. minna Riley and Corbet, 1938 (Peninsular Malaya, Burma, Thailand)
 J. c. natsumiae H.Hayashi, 1976 (Philippines: Palawan, Alibobogan)
 J. c. nemea C. Felder, 1860 (Indonesia: Maluku, Ambon)
 J. c. raddatzi Schröder and Treadaway, 1984 (Philippines: Sibuyan Island)
 J. c. vardusia (Fruhstorfer, 1915) (Java)
 J. c. zelea (Fruhstorfer, 1915) (southern Sulawesi, Banggai)

Gallery

References

, 1832. Voyage de découvertes de l'Astrolabe (etc.). Faune entomologique de l'Ocean Pacifique (etc.). Paris. J Tastu, 716 pp.
, 1992. A generic classification of the tribe Polyommatini of the Oriental and Australian regions (Lepidoptera, Lycaenidae, Polyommatinae). Bulletin of the University of Osaka Prefecture, Series B, Vol. 44, Suppl.
, 1999. The Butterflies of Papua New Guinea Academic Press, 
, 1989. On some type specimens of Lycaenidae from South East Asia. Tyô to Ga 40(1): 23–80.

Butterflies described in 1832
Jamides
Butterflies of Borneo